National 

Aucha Lochy is an impounding reservoir, situated 1 km to the north/north east of Campbeltown and is the main source of freshwater for the town.  The loch is also fished by Kintyre Angling Club. The earth fill dam was completed in 1905 and has a height of 8.8 metres.

See also
 List of lochs in Scotland
 List of reservoirs and dams in the United Kingdom

Sources

"Argyll and Bute Council Reservoirs Act 1975 Public Register"

Reservoirs in Argyll and Bute
Kintyre